Talang 2008 was the second season of the talent show Talang, the Swedish version of Got Talent. It was broadcast from April 4, 2008 to May 30, 2008. The host was only one person, Peppe Eng, with Kodjo Akolor as his "sidekick". The panel of judges was Bert Karlsson, Sofia Wistam and Tobbe Blom.

This season was won by 10-year-old singer Zara Larsson, who received the prize money of 500,000 SEK as a result.

The audition tour visited Falun, Umeå, Malmö, Gothenburg and Stockholm. All auditions took place in March 2008, one month before the season started broadcasting on TV.

Finalists
Jongleur Johan Wellton
Pianist David Fang
Singer Sebastian Krantz
Magician Seth Engström
Singer Sofia med storbandet
Pianist Karina Sarkisyan
Rapper RMK & Co
Singer Zara Larsson (WINNER)

References

Talang (Swedish TV series)
2008 Swedish television seasons